Waldemar Korcz (born 19 January 1949) is a Polish weightlifter. He competed in the men's flyweight event at the 1972 Summer Olympics.

References

1949 births
Living people
Polish male weightlifters
Olympic weightlifters of Poland
Weightlifters at the 1972 Summer Olympics
People from Elbląg
World Weightlifting Championships medalists